= Innocent Criminals =

Innocent Criminals may refer to:

- Silverchair, an Australian rock band formerly named Innocent Criminals
- Ben Harper and the Innocent Criminals, an American rock band featuring Ben Harper
